Ahmed Khamis (born 16 November 1985), also known as Ahmed, is an Emirati footballer who plays for Al Urooba as a midfielder.

Honours

Club
Al Ain
Etisalat Emirates Cup: 1
 2008–09
UAE President's Cup: 1
 2008–09

External links
 
 
 

1985 births
Living people
Emirati footballers
Al Ain FC players
Al Ahli Club (Dubai) players
Baniyas Club players
Fujairah FC players
Sharjah FC players
Al-Nasr SC (Dubai) players
Hatta Club players
Dibba FC players
Al Urooba Club players
Association football midfielders
UAE First Division League players
UAE Pro League players
Footballers at the 2006 Asian Games
Asian Games competitors for the United Arab Emirates